Pedro Bartolomé Benoit Vanderhorst  (February 13, 1921, Samaná – April 5, 2012) was a politician and military officer from the Dominican Republic. He served as the 7th provisional president of the Dominican Republic from 1 May until 7 May 1965. He was also a member of the Revolutionary Committee, which ruled the country for about few hours on 25 April 1965.

References

 Rulers.org

1921 births
2012 deaths

People from Samaná Province
Presidents of the Dominican Republic
Dominican Republic rebels